Special circumstances in criminal law are actions of the accused, or conditions under which a crime, particularly homicide, was committed. Such factors require or allow for a more severe punishment.

Special circumstances are elements of the crime itself, and thus must be proven beyond a reasonable doubt during the guilt phase of the trial. As such, they are formally distinct from aggravating circumstances, in that the latter are proven during the penalty phase of the trial instead.

Examples 
In California, if a defendant is convicted of first-degree murder and one of 22 listed special circumstances are found to be true, the only possible penalties are life in prison without parole or death (25 years to life if the defendant was a juvenile). As of March 2019, the Governor of California placed a moratorium on capital punishment.

In Connecticut, there are eight ways to be convicted of murder with special circumstances, all mandating life in prison without the possibility of parole.

References

External links
 AGGRAVATING FACTORS FOR CAPITAL PUNISHMENT BY STATE, Death Penalty Information Center

Criminal law